Kurt Felix (born 4 July 1988) is a Grenadian athlete who competes in the decathlon. He was the NCAA 2012 Division I Decathlon Champion and was named the Mountain West Men's Outdoor Track and Field Student-Athlete of the Year. He competed at the 2012 Summer Olympics and the 2016 Summer Olympics and won the bronze medal at the 2014 Commonwealth Games.
On 24–25 July 2017, Kurt participated in the 21st Stadtwerke Ratingen Mehrkampf-meeting which was part of the IAAF Combined Events Challenge. He placed second at the meet with a score of 8509 points and set a meeting record in the Javelin Throw with a distance of 72.80m.

On 5 January 2018 at the National Sports Awards, Kurt received the Presidential Award of Merrit for 2017 from the Grenada Olympic Committee. He opened his 2018 Season by taking part in the Hepathlon competition at the World Indoor Championships but did not finish. He then competed in the Commonwealth Games where he finished forth in the decathlon with 7756 points.

His younger brother Lindon Victor is also a decathlete.

Personal bests

Competition record

References

External links

Tilastopaja biography

1988 births
Living people
Athletes (track and field) at the 2012 Summer Olympics
Athletes (track and field) at the 2016 Summer Olympics
Olympic athletes of Grenada
Grenadian decathletes
Athletes (track and field) at the 2010 Commonwealth Games
Athletes (track and field) at the 2014 Commonwealth Games
Athletes (track and field) at the 2018 Commonwealth Games
Commonwealth Games bronze medallists for Grenada
Commonwealth Games medallists in athletics
Athletes (track and field) at the 2015 Pan American Games
Athletes (track and field) at the 2019 Pan American Games
Pan American Games silver medalists for Grenada
Pan American Games medalists in athletics (track and field)
World Athletics Championships athletes for Grenada
Grenadian male javelin throwers
Grenadian male discus throwers
Medalists at the 2015 Pan American Games
Medallists at the 2014 Commonwealth Games